Mister Monday is the first novel in the series The Keys to the Kingdom by Garth Nix. It follows Arthur Penhaligon, a twelve-year-old boy who discovers that he is the heir to an otherworldly House and must fulfil a mysterious Will in order to claim it from seven antagonistic Trustees.

Plot
Twelve-year-old Arthur Penhaligon is experiencing a severe asthma attack at school when two mysterious men, Mister Monday and his butler Sneezer, appear in front of him. Sneezer convinces Monday to give Arthur his Minute Key in order to fulfill Monday's directive from the Architect. Although Monday is skeptical, Sneezer argues that Arthur will die shortly and the Key will then be returned to Monday. However, Arthur is saved when school officials arrive with help. Sneezer and Monday disappear, leaving a small book in their place, which Arthur takes.

Arthur spends a week in the hospital and is visited by his new friends Leaf and her brother Ed. Leaf confirms that she also saw Monday and Sneezer, and Ed adds that he saw dog-faced men digging up the school field looking for something. Arthur realizes that they are looking for his Key. Once back at home, Arthur uses the Key to open the book, The Compleat Atlas of the House and Immediate Environs, which describes the House and its environs. That night he is attacked by the dog-faced men that Ed saw, described as "Fetchers" by the Atlas. The Key protects Arthur by bringing his ceramic Komodo dragon to life to fend off the Fetchers.

The next day at school, Arthur learns that Leaf and Ed have contracted a mysterious disease. More Fetchers attempt to pursue Arthur and he is also attacked by Monday's Noon, a more powerful creature. Arthur manages to evade them all, but his day is further interrupted when a medical team announces a city-wide quarantine as the mysterious disease spreads. Arthur realizes the Fetchers are spreading the disease and he decides to enter the House in hopes of finding a cure.

With help of the Atlas, Arthur navigates his way through the House, which he discovers is a world unto itself, around which the Universe is organized, created by a divine being called "the Architect." The Architect went away and entrusted the seven Trustees known as "the Morrow Days" to fulfil her Will. Prior to the Architect's departure, she imprisoned her consort, the Old One, for meddling with the Secondary Realms (the human world). Without guidance from the Architect or the Old One, the Morrow Days each fell victim to one of the seven deadly sins and the House descended into chaos. As the Rightful Heir, Arthur must find the seven parts of the Will hidden by the Morrow Days and reclaim all parts of the House in order to fulfil the Architect's Will and restore the House to its original purpose.

To secure the Lower House from Mister Monday, Arthur must steal the Hour Key from him. On his journey, Arthur briefly meets the Old One and also meets a Cockney girl-child named Suzy Turquoise Blue, who is possessed by the first part of the Will, a bossy, jade-colored frog.

The Will advises Arthur and Suzy on how to break into Monday's quarters. Arthur successfully reclaims the Lower House and gains the Hour Key, which combines with the Minute Key to be the First Key of the House. Now freed, first part of the Will takes the form of Dame Primus. Arthur decides to turn governance of the Lower House to Dame Primus and uses the First Key to heal Mister Monday from his affliction of Sloth. Arthur receives a cure for the Fetchers' disease and returns home, relieved that his adventures in the House are over.

However, Dame Primus contacts Arthur at midnight, when the day has become Tuesday, to tell Arthur that he is urgently needed back at the House.

Publication history 
Mister Monday published on July 1, 2003, from Scholastic. In 2007, as part of a promotional campaign, a British bookstore chain gave away at least 50,000 copies of Mister Monday to accompany pre-ordered copies of J.K. Rowling's Harry Potter and the Deadly Hollows.

Critical reception 
Mister Monday received generally positive reviews upon its initial release. Publishers Weekly gave it a starred review, saying, "With a likeable unlikely hero, fast-paced plotting and a plethora of mystical oddities (e.g., Mister Monday only has "dominion over everything" on Mondays), this series is sure to garner a host of fans." BookPage praised the worldbuilding of the series, noting, "Nix traps the reader in his world much as the House traps Arthur." Fantasy Book Review praised Nix's writing and favorably compared him to Roald Dahl, noting how the story contained multiple layers for adult and young adult readers. Ruth Arnell of Fantasy Literature gave it four out of five stars, saying, "Recommended for anyone who enjoys fantasy targeted to the younger set, but which is still interesting enough for an adult." The novel received the Aurealis Award for Children's Long Fiction in 2003 and the audiobook edition of Mister Monday was named a Selected Audiobook for Young Adults by the American Library Association.

Film adaptation 
In 2019, Deadline reported that Herschend Entertainment Studios purchased the film/television rights to the Keys to the Kingdom series, with Nix to serve as an executive producer.

See also 

 The Keys to the Kingdom

References

External links 
 

1
2003 novels
Novels by Garth Nix
Children's fantasy novels
2003 fantasy novels
Aurealis Award-winning works
Allen & Unwin books
Seven deadly sins in popular culture